Erast Evgenievich Goulaeff  or Erast Evgenievich Gulyaev (1846–1919) was a Russian naval architect, who designed the Russian imperial yacht Livadia among other notable ships.

References 

Russian naval architects
1846 births
1919 deaths